He Zhuoqiang (Chinese: 何灼强; born: 12 January 1967) is a male Chinese weightlifter. He competed at 1988 Seoul Olympics, and won a bronze medal in men's 52 kg.

References

External links 
 
 

1967 births
Living people
Chinese male weightlifters
Olympic weightlifters of China
Olympic medalists in weightlifting
Olympic bronze medalists for China
Weightlifters at the 1988 Summer Olympics
Medalists at the 1988 Summer Olympics
Asian Games medalists in weightlifting
Asian Games gold medalists for China
Weightlifters at the 1986 Asian Games
Weightlifters at the 1990 Asian Games
Medalists at the 1986 Asian Games
Medalists at the 1990 Asian Games
World Weightlifting Championships medalists
20th-century Chinese people